{{Infobox newspaper
| name                 = Dainik Tribune
| logo                 = Logo of Dainik tribune.gif
| image                = Danik tribune.GIF
| image_size           = 220px
| caption              = Front page of 'Dainik Tribune on 22 May 2013 of Haryana edition.
| type                 = Daily newspaper
| format               = Broadsheet
| owners               = The Tribune Trust
| founder              = 
| publisher            = 
| editor               = Naresh Kaushal
| president            = 
| chiefeditor          = 
| assoceditor          = 
| maneditor            = 
| newseditor           = 
| managingeditordesign = 
| campuseditor         = 
| campuschief          = 
| opeditor             = 
| sportseditor         = 
| photoeditor          = 
| staff                = 
| foundation           = 15 August 1978
| political            = Neutral 
| language             = Hindi
| ceased publication   = 
| relaunched           =
| headquarters         = 
| circulation          = 
| sister newspapers    = The TribunePunjabi Tribune| ISSN                 = 
| oclc                 = 
| website              = 
| free                 = Yes
| dirinteractive       =
}}Dainik Tribune (Hindi: दैनिक ट्रिब्यून) is an Indian Hindi-language daily newspaper that is being currently published from Chandigarh, New Delhi, Jalandhar and Bathinda. It was first established in 1978 by The Tribune Trust, which published The Tribune and the Punjabi Tribune.About us Rajesh Ramachandran is the Editor-in-Chief of The Tribune Group of Newspapers. Naresh Kaushal is the Editor of Dainik Tribune. The Internet editions of the Dainik Tribune were launched on 16 August 2010.
 
See alsoPunjabi TribuneThe Tribune''

References

External links
 Official website
 Dainik Tribune, epaper (Punjab/Himachal Edition)
 Dainik Tribune (Haryana edition)

Newspaper companies of India
Hindi-language newspapers
Daily newspapers published in India
Mass media in Haryana
Mass media in Punjab, India
Newspapers established in 1978
Asian news websites
1978 establishments in India